The jian (pronunciation （劍）,) is a double-edged straight sword used during the last 2,500 years in China. The first Chinese sources that mention the jian date to the 7th century BCE, during the Spring and Autumn period; one of the earliest specimens being the Sword of Goujian. The weight of an average sword of  blade-length would be in a range of approximately 700 to 900 grams (1.5 to 2 pounds). There are also larger two-handed versions used for training by many styles of Chinese martial arts.

Professional jian practitioners are referred to as jianke ( or "swordsmen"; a term dating from the Han dynasty).

In Chinese folklore, it is known as "The Gentleman of Weapons" and is considered one of the four major weapons, along with the gun (staff), qiang (spear), and the dao (sabre). These swords are also sometimes referred to as taijijian or "tai chi swords", reflecting their current use as training weapons for taijiquan practitioners, though there were no historical jian types created specifically for taijiquan.

Parts of the jian

A guard or hilt protects the hand from an opposing blade. Guard shapes varied, but often had short wings or lobes pointing either forward or backward, the latter sometimes having an "ace of spades" appearance. Early jian often had very small, simple guards. From the Song and Ming periods onward guards could feature zoomorphic shapes, or have crossbars and quillons. A minority of jian featured the disc-shaped guards associated with dao.

The jian's hilt can accommodate the grip of both hands or one hand plus two or three fingers of the other hand. The longer two-handed handle could be used as a lever to lock the opponent's arm if necessary. Grips are usually of fluted wood or covered in rayskin, with a minority being wrapped with cord.

The end of the handle was finished with a pommel for balance, to prevent the handle from sliding through the hand if the hand's grip should be loosened, and for striking or trapping the opponent as opportunity required—such as in "withdrawing" techniques. The pommel was historically peened onto the tang of the blade; thereby holding together as one solid unit the blade, guard, handle, and pommel. Most jian of the last century or so are assembled with a threaded tang onto which the pommel or pommel-nut is screwed.

Sometimes a tassel is attached to the hilt. During the Ming Dynasty these were usually passed through an openwork pommel, and in the Qing through a hole in the grip itself; modern swords usually attach the tassel to the end of the pommel. Historically these were likely used as lanyards, allowing the wielder to retain the sword in combat. There are some sword forms which utilize the tassel as an integral part of their swordsmanship style (sometimes offensively), while other schools dispense with sword tassels entirely. The movement of the tassel may have served to distract opponents, and some schools further claim that metal wires or thin silk cords were once worked into the tassels for impairing vision and causing bleeding when swept across the face. The tassel's use now is primarily decorative.

The blade itself is customarily divided into three sections for leverage in different offensive and defensive techniques. The tip of the blade is the jiànfeng, meant for stabbing, slashing, and quick percussive cuts. The jiànfeng typically curves smoothly to a point, though in the Ming period sharply angled points were common. Some antiques have rounded points, though these are likely the result of wear. The middle section is the zhongren or middle edge, and is used for a variety of offensive and defensive actions: cleaving cuts, draw cuts, and deflections. The section of blade closest to the guard is called the jiàngen or root, and is mainly used for defensive actions; on some late period jian, the base of the blade was made into a ricasso. These sections are not necessarily of the same length, with the jiànfeng being only three or four inches long.

Jian blades generally feature subtle profile taper (decreasing width), but often have considerable distal taper (decreasing thickness), with blade thickness near the tip being only half the thickness of the root's base. Jiàn may also feature differential sharpening, where the blade is made progressively sharper towards the tip, usually corresponding to the three sections of the blade. The cross-section of the blade is typically lenticular (eye-shaped) or a flattened diamond, with a visible central ridge; ancient bronze jian sometimes have a hexagonal cross-section.

Materials

Jian were originally made from bronze, then steel as metal technology advanced. There are some, perhaps ceremonial, jian which are carved from a single solid piece of jade.

Traditional jian blades are usually of sanmei (three plate) construction, which involved sandwiching a core of hard steel between two plates of softer steel. The central plate protrudes slightly from its surrounding pieces, allowing for a sharp edge, while the softer spine protects the brittle core. Some blades had wumei or five plate construction, with two more soft plates being used at the central ridge. Bronze jian were often made in a somewhat similar manner: in this case an alloy with a high copper content would be used to make a resilient core and spine, while the edge would be made from a high-tin-content alloy for sharpness and welded onto the rest of the blade.

The sword smiths of China are often credited with the forging technologies that traveled to Vietnam, Japan and Korea to allow sword smiths there to create such weapons as the katana. These technologies include folding, inserted alloys, and differential hardening of the edge. While the Japanese would be more influenced by the Chinese dāo (single-edged swords of various forms), the early Japanese swords known as ken are often based on jian. The Korean version of the jian is known as the geom or gum, and these swords often preserve features found in Ming-era jian, such as openwork pommels and sharply angled tips.

In martial art schools wooden swords are used for training, so most martial arts students' first experience with a jian in modern times is with one of those weapons. Before schools were a formal way of passing on sword knowledge, students may begin with a simple wooden stick when training with their teacher. In some religious Taoist sects, those wooden practice swords have come to have an esoteric ritual purpose. Some claim that these wooden swords metaphorically represent the discipline of an accomplished student.

Contemporary jian versions are often forged (shaped with heat and hammer) and assembled by mostly traditional methods for training of practitioners of Chinese martial arts around the world. These jian vary greatly in quality and historical accuracy.

Contemporary jian are also sometimes forgeries (artificially aged and misrepresented as original antiques), for sale to tourists and collectors who cannot distinguish them from true antiques.

Historical use

Originally similar to bronze double-edged daggers in varying lengths, jian reached modern lengths by roughly 500 BC. Though there is significant variation in length, balance, and weight of the jian from different periods, within any given period the general purpose of the jian is to be a multipurpose cut and thrust weapon capable of stabbing, as well as making both precise cuts and slashes, as opposed to specializing in one form of use. Although the many forms and schools of swordsmanship with the jian vary as well, the general purpose and use is still not lost.

During the Qin and Han dynasties, the first two dynasties which united China, jian from the by then defunct Chu dynasty were very highly regarded. Chu became particularly famous for its swords after conquering the state of Yue, who had previously been famous for their swords, and who credited their sword techniques to a southern woman of unknown ancestry referred to as Yuenü.

Among the Terracotta warriors in the tomb of Qin Shi Huang, figures representing officers were originally armed with jian made from an alloy of copper, tin, and other elements including nickel, magnesium, and cobalt. Several double-edged bronze swords have been recovered by modern archaeologists, but most were stolen centuries ago along with the polearms and bows of the enlisted men.

Historical jian wielders would engage in test cutting called shizhan, practicing their skills on targets known as caoren, or "grass men". Such targets were made from bamboo, rice straw, or saplings. Though similar to the Japanese art of tameshigiri, shizhan was never formalized to the extent that the latter art was.

Today many Chinese martial arts such as taijiquan and their martial artists still train extensively with jian and expertise in its techniques is said by many of them to be the highest physical expression of their kung fu. Famous jian forms include Sancai Jian, Kunwu Jian, Wudang Xuanmen Jian, and Taijijian. Most jian today are flexible tai-chi or wushu jian used mainly for ceremonial or performance purposes and not for actual combat. These swords have extremely thin blades or a high degree of flexibility compared to historical battlefield quality jian, properties intended to add auditory and visual appeal to a wushu performance. These same properties render them unsuitable for historically accurate combat.

Military use
Since 2008, officers in the Chinese navy are issued with ceremonial swords resembling the traditional jian. Each sword has the owner's name engraved on the blade after graduation from the military academy.

Tai Chi Sword and Sword Drill 
At present, the Tai Chi Sword forms are normally practiced for exercises purposes just like Tai Chi Quan. The trainings are less on the physical form of the weapon and more on gaining greater balance and co-ordination through performing the slow movements. So the Tai Chi swords for everyday exercises are normally different from the swords mentioned above. Generally speaking, they are not dangerous, round edged without sharp blade, retractable for the convenience in use.

Mythology and legacy 

There are several Taoist immortals who are associated with the jian. One example is Lü Dongbin. The bodhisattva Mañjuśrī (Ch:  Wénshū) is often depicted holding a jian, which is then referred to as the "sword of wisdom".

Jian frequently appear in wuxia fiction and films. The swords or the techniques used to wield them may be effectively or explicitly supernatural, and the quest for such swords or techniques may be a major plot element.

In popular culture
 In Heroes of the East, a jian sword was one of many weapons used by the hero Ho Tao.
 In Cardcaptor Sakura,  a jian sword is the signature weapon of Syaoran Li.
 In Tsubasa: Reservoir Chronicle, a similar jian sword is used by one of Syaoran's alternative versions, Tsubasa.
 In Mulan (1998), the title character, the Chinese army, and Shan Yu use jian swords.
 In Crouching Tiger, Hidden Dragon, Shu Lien uses a jian sword while teaching Princess Jen.
 In the 2000 film Dragonheart: A New Beginning, Master Kwan briefly wielded a jian sword.
 Inuyasha the Movie: Affections Touching Across Time features Menomaru wielding a jian sword.
 In Lupin III: Stolen Lupin, Hakuryuu  wields a jian sword.
 In Avatar: The Last Airbender, Sokka discovers a meteorite that he used to forged and learned to use a jian sword under the mentorship of Piandao.
 In Pirates of the Caribbean: At World's End, Elizabeth Swann used a jian sword.
 In Deadliest Warrior, Sun Tzu uses a jian sword versus Vlad the Impaler.
 In the 2014 Netflix series Marco Polo, Kublai Khan uses a jian sword.
 Dynasty Warriors features Liu Bei wielding a jian sword.

See also
 Chinese swords
 Dao (Chinese sword)
 Jiǎn
 Kung Fu
 Taijijian
Khanda
 Tsurugi (Japanese sword)
 World Jianshu League
 Wudang Mountains
 Wushu (sport)
 Zhang Sanfeng
 Shuangshou jian

Notes

References

External links

 Late master Ma Yueliang Wu style Taijiquan 108 posture jian form video 
 Late master Zhou Jingxuan explaining the mechanics of Jian practice and fighting in the Shaolin Jingang Bashi system

Chinese swords
Tai chi
Events in wushu